HMS Pactolus was one of eight 38-gun Cydnus-class fifth-rate frigates of the Royal Navy, that served in the Napoleonic wars and the War of 1812.  She was one of the warships that bombarded Stonington, Connecticut from 9 to 12 August 1814. Pactolus was paid off in August 1817 and sold in 1818.

Construction
Cydnus-class frigates such as Pactolus were actually Leda-class frigates, but built of red fir (pine). Pine was cheaper and more abundant than oak and permitted noticeably faster construction, but at a cost of a reduced lifespan. The motive for the use of red pine – an inferior material for shipbuilding – was speed of construction. It was much quicker to build a ship with this material than one of oak; the drawback was that these fir-built ships were less durable than oak-built ships.

Like all the 38-gun British frigates of the late Napoleonic wars period, she carried twenty-eight 18-pounder guns on the upper deck, fourteen 32-pounder carronades on the quarter deck, and two 9-pounder guns and another two 32-pounder carronades on the forecastle. Under the re-classifications in February 1817, this resulted in her being re-classed from 38 to 46 guns.

Service
Pactolus was commissioned in September 1813 under Captain Frederick William Aylmer. He would remain her captain to the end of 1815.

Together, the vessels attacked Stonington, Connecticut. Stonington was known for preparing and harbouring "torpedoes", that is naval mines, and for supporting American attempts to destroy British warships off New London.

Action commenced on 9 August, when Dispatch anchored within pistol shot of a battery on shore and opened fire, which the battery answered. The water was too shallow for Pactolus to follow, so Dispatch withdrew, having suffered casualties of two men dead and twelve wounded. On 11 August Terror lobbed shells into the town. Ramillies and Pactolus then anchored as close to the town as they could and opened fire, doing a great deal of damage. As they started their bombardment, the Americans withdrew their guns from the battery to the outskirts of town where a large force of militia had gathered. Hardy then withdrew.

Pactolus was one of some seven ships that shared in the capture of the Spanish brig Patriota on 6 September.

On 7 December 1814 Pactolus captured the schooner Armistice, of 3 guns, 15 men and 143 tons. A privateer later recaptured Armistice, but then  re-recaptured the schooner. Two days later, Pactolus captured the schooner Post Bay of 8 men and 73 tons.

Pactolus was on a mission to treat with the authorities in Bordeaux over the reestablishment of the monarchy in France. Though the British squadron was under a flag of truce, the fort at Verdon opened fire on them, but without effect. The next day the French evacuated the fort and a British landing party dismantled and destroyed the guns. Over the next few days they destroyed several more French forts in the area. The British took possession of the forts of Verdon, Royan, de Lotisac, and Miche, which they completely dismantled. They took nearly 70 pieces of heavy artillery (mostly French thirty-six-pounders), including many mortars, all of which they completely spiked and whose carriages they rendered useless. On 22 July Bordeaux declared for the monarchy as French troops, which Hebrus had brought with her on two transports, took control.

In January 1816 Captain William Hugh Dobbie took command of Pactolus for the Halifax, Nova Scotia, station. She sailed in May. In July 1816 Pactolus returned to Portsmouth.

Fate
Pactolus was paid off in August 1817 as being no longer seaworthy due to dry rot. The Admiralty sold her to Mr. Maund for £2,790 on 29 January 1818.

Notes

Citations

References

External links

War of 1812 ships of the United Kingdom
Leda-class frigates
1813 ships
Fifth-rate frigates of the Royal Navy